This list covers television programs whose first letter (excluding "the") of the title is G.

G

GA
Gabby's Dollhouse
Gabby Duran & The Unsittables
Gabriel's Fire
Gadget and the Gadgetinis
Gadget Boy & Heather
Gal Circle
Galactic Football
Galavant
The Gale Storm Show
Gambit
The Game (Australia)
The Game (US)
The Games (Australia)
The Games (UK)
Game of Crowns
Game Shakers
Game of Talents
Game of Thrones
Gamer's Guide to Pretty Much Everything
Gameshow Marathon (UK)
Gameshow Marathon (US)
Gamezville
Gandía Shore (Spain)
Gangs of London
 Galtar and the Golden Lance
 The Garcias
Gardeners' World
Garfield and Friends
The Garfield Show
Greys Anatomy
Gargoyles
Garrow's Law
The Garry Moore Show
Garth Marenghi's Darkplace
The Gates
The Gavin Crawford Show
Gavin & Stacey (UK)
Gawayn
Gay for Play Game Show Starring RuPaul
The Gayle King Show

GC
GCB

GE
G.E. College Bowl
Gemini Man
Gemusetto
Gen:Lock
Genera+ion
Generation O!
Generator Rex
General Electric Theater
General Hospital
General Hospital: Night Shift
The Generations Project
Gene Simmons Family Jewels
Genius Junior
Gentle Ben
Geordie Shore (UK)
George and Martha (Canada)
George and Mildred
The George Burns and Gracie Allen Show
George Lopez
The George Michael Sports Machine
George of the Jungle
George Shrinks
Gerald McBoing-Boing
Geraldo
 Geronimo Stilton
 Gerry Anderson's New Captain Scarlet
Get Ace (Australia)
Get a Life
Get Blake! (France)
Get Ed
Get Real (UK)
Get Real (US)
Get Smart (1965)
Get Smart (1995)
Get the Message
Get the Picture
Geronimo Stilton
Get Out Of My Room

GG
GG Bond

GH
Ghost Adventures
Ghost Adventures: Aftershocks
The Ghost and Molly McGee
Ghostbusters
Ghosthunters (UK)
Ghost Hunters (US)
Ghost Hunters Academy
Ghost Hunters International
Ghosthunting With...
The Ghost & Mrs. Muir
Ghost in the Shell: Stand Alone Complex
Ghost Nation
Ghost Stalkers
Ghost Story
Ghost Trackers
Ghost Wars
Ghost Whisperer
Ghosted
Ghosted: Love Gone Missing
Ghosts (1995 UK)
Ghosts (2019 UK)
Ghosts (US)
Ghostwriter

GI
Giada at Home
Giada in Paradise
Giada's Weekend Getaways
G.I. Joe: A Real American Hero (1985)
G.I. Joe: A Real American Hero (1989)
 G.I. Joe Extreme
G.I. Joe: Renegades
G.I. Joe: Sigma 6
Gideon's Crossing
Gideon's Way
Gidget
The Gifted
Gigantic
Gigantor
The Gilded Age
Gilligan's Island
Gilmore Girls
Gilmore Girls: A Year in the Life
Gimme a Break
The Girl Before
Girlboss
Girl Code
The Girl from U.N.C.L.E.
Girl Meets World
Girlstuff/Boystuff
Girls vs. Boys
The Girl With Something Extra
Girlfriends
Girlfriends' Guide to Divorce
Girls
Girls Behaving Badly
Girls Club
The Girls Next Door
The Girls Next Door: The Bunny House
Giuliana and Bill
Give Us a Clue (UK)
Giver

GL
The Glades
Gladiators
Gladiators 2000
Gladiators: Train 2 Win (UK)
The Glass House
Glee
The Glee Project
The Glen Campbell Goodtime Hour
Glenn Beck Program
Glenn Martin DDS
Glitch AUS
Glitch Techs
Glitter Force
Gloria
GLOW
Glow Up

GO
Go
Go Away, Unicorn!
Go-Big Show
Go, Diego, Go!
GoGo Sentai Boukenger
Go! Go! Cory Carson
Go Jetters
Go On
God Friended Me
Godless
 Godzilla: The Series
Gogs
Goin' Bulilit
Going Live!
Going Places (US)
Going Places (Australia)
The Goldbergs (1949)
The Goldbergs (2013)
The Golden Girls
The Golden Palace
Golden Sisters
Goldie & Bear
Goliath
Gomer Pyle, U.S.M.C.
Gone
Gone Country
The Gong Show
Good Behavior
Good Bones
Good Day L.A.
Good Doctor (South Korea)
The Good Doctor (US)
Good Eats
 The Goode Family
The Good Fight
Good Girls
Good Girls Revolt
Good Grief
The Good Guys
The Good Life (1971)
The Good Life (1994)
The Good Lord Bird
Good Luck Charlie
Good Morning America
Good Morning, Miami
Good Morning, Mickey!
Good Morning, Miss Bliss
Goodness Gracious Me
Good Omens
The Good Place
Good Times
Good Trouble
The Good Wife (South Korea)
The Good Wife (US)
Good Witch
Good Work
Goof Troop
Gordon Ramsay: Cookalong Live (UK)
Gordon Ramsay: Uncharted
Gordon Ramsay's 24 Hours to Hell & Back
Gordon Ramsay's Home Cooking (UK)
Gordon Ramsay's Ultimate Cookery Course (UK)
Goosebumps
Gossip Girl (2007)
Gossip Girl (2021)
Gossip Girl: Acapulco (Mexico)
Gossip Girl: Thailand
Gotham
The Governor and J.J.

GR
Grace (UK)
Grace & Favour
Grace and Frankie
Grace Under Fire
The Graham Norton Show (UK)
Grand Army
Grand Hotel
Grandfathered
Grandstand
Grange Hill (UK)
Gravity Falls
The Great
The Great American Baking Show
The Great British Bake Off (UK)
The Great British Bake Off: An Extra Slice (UK)
The Great British Sewing Bee (UK)
Great Chefs
The Great Christmas Light Fight
The Great Indoors
Great News
The Great North
Great Performances
The Great Pottery Throw Down (UK)
The Great Space Coaster
The Greatest American Hero
Greatest Party Story Ever
Greed
Greek
Green Acres
Greenhouse Academy
Greenleaf
Greg the Bunny
Grey's Anatomy
Griff
Grim & Evil
Grim Adventures of Billy and Mandy
Grimm
Grizzy and the Lemmings (France)
Grojband (Canada)
Groove High
Grossology
Grounded for Life
Groundling Marsh
Growing Pains
Growing up with Chinese (China)
Growing Up Creepie
Grown-ish

GU

Guess with Jess
Guiding Light
Les Guignols de l'info (France)
Guilt (US)
Guilt (UK)
Guilty Party
 Guinevere Jones
Gullah Gullah Island
Gumby
Gundam Seed
Gundam Seed Destiny
Gundam Wing
Gundam X
Gunslinger Girl
Gunsmoke
Gurren Lagann
Guy Code
Guy Court
Guy Off the Hook
Guy's Big Bite
Guy's Grocery Games

GY
Gypsy Sisters

Previous:  List of television programs: F    Next:  List of television programs: H